Raghubir Singh (1942–1999) was an Indian photographer, most known for his landscapes and documentary-style photographs of the people of India. He was a self-taught photographer who worked in India and lived in Paris, London and New York. During his career he worked with National Geographic Magazine, The New York Times, The New Yorker and Time. In the early 1970s, he was one of the first photographers to reinvent the use of color at a time when color photography was still a marginal art form.

Singh belonged to a tradition of small-format street photography, working in color, that to him, represented the intrinsic value of Indian aesthetics. According to his 2004 retrospective his "documentary-style vision was neither sugarcoated, nor abject, nor controllingly omniscient". Deeply influenced by modernism, he liberally took inspiration from Rajasthani miniatures, Mughal paintings and Bengal, a place where he thought western modernist ideas and vernacular Indian art were fused for the first time, as reflected in the works of the Bengal school and the humanism of filmmaker Satyajit Ray. "Beauty, nature, humanism and spirituality were the cornerstones of Indian culture" for him and became the bedrock for his work.

Singh published 14 well-received books on the Ganges, Calcutta, Benares, his native Rajasthan, Grand Trunk Road, and the Hindustan Ambassador car. Today, his work is part of the permanent collections of the Art Institute of Chicago, the Metropolitan Museum of Art and Museum of Modern Art in New York and the Tokyo Metropolitan Museum of Photography, amongst others.

Early life and education

Singh was born into an aristocratic Rajput family in 1942 in Jaipur. His grandfather was Commander-in-chief of the Jaipur Armed Forces, while his father was a Thakur or feudal landowner of Khetri (now in Jhunjhunu district, Rajasthan). After independence, his family saw a dwindling of its fortune. As a schoolboy, he discovered Beautiful Jaipur, Cartier-Bresson's little-known book published in 1948, which inspired his interest in photography.

After his schooling at St. Xavier's School, Jaipur, he joined the Hindu College (Delhi) but dropped out in his first year. It was here that he took a serious interest in photography.

Career

Photographer
Singh first moved to Calcutta to begin a career in the tea industry, as had his elder brother before him. This turned out to be unsuccessful, but by this time, he had started to take photographs. In Calcutta, Singh met the historian R. P. Gupta, who later contributed text for his first book Ganges (1974). Singh was gradually introduced to a circle of city artists who deeply influenced his later work, especially the realism of filmmaker Satyajit Ray, who later designed the cover of his first book and wrote the introduction to his Rajasthan book. This also set a precedent for literary input in his future books, as in the coming years the writer V. S. Naipaul conducted a dialogue with him for the preface to his book Bombay (1994), while R. K. Narayan wrote the introduction to Tamil Nadu (1997).

By the mid-1960s, Life Magazine had published eight pages of his photographs about student unrest. He later moved to Hong Kong and started doing photo features for National Geographic Magazine, The New York Times...

After a decade of travelling along the Ganges, Singh published his first book Ganges in 1974, with an introduction by Eric Newby. Though his early work was inspired by Henri Cartier-Bresson's documentary-style photographs of India, he chose colour as his medium, responding to the vivid colours of India, and over time adapted western techniques to Indian aesthetics.

In the 1970s, Singh moved to Paris and over the following three decades, through rigorous training and exposure, he created a series of portfolios of colour photography on India. His style was influenced by Mughal painting and Rajasthani miniature paintings, whose individual sections maintain their autonomy within the overall frame.

In his early work, Singh focused on the geographic and social anatomy of cities and regions in India. His work on Bombay in the early 1990s marks a turning point in his stylistic development.

Singh published over 14 books. In the last of these, A Way into India (2002), published posthumously, the Ambassador car in which he travelled on all his journeys across Indian since 1957 becomes a camera obscura. Singh uses its doors and windshield to frame and divide his photographs. In the accompanying text, John Baldessari compares Singh to Orson Welles for his juxtaposition of near and far and to Mondrian for his fragmentation of space.

Teacher
In addition to his photographic work, Singh taught in New York at the School of Visual Arts, Columbia University and Cooper Union.

Awards
 1983: Padma Shri, by Government of India
 1986–1987: First Fellowship in Photography of the National Museum of Photography, Bradford
 1999: Mother Jones Lifetime Achievement Award
 2001: Maharaja Sawai Ram Singh Award (posthumously)

Personal life
In 1972, he married Anne de Henning, also a photographer, and the couple had a daughter, Devika Singh, who is curator at the Tate Modern and holds a position at Cambridge University.

Singh died on 18 April 1999 of a heart attack. Upon his death, the art critic Max Kozloff wrote, "If you can imagine what a Rajput miniaturist could have learned from Henri Cartier-Bresson, you'll have a glimmer of Raghubir Singh's aesthetic."

Controversy
On 3 December 2017, artist Jaishri Abichandani organized a protest outside the Met Breuer, where Singh's "Modernism on the Ganges" opened as an exhibit on 11 October 2017. She accused Singh of having sexually assaulted her in the mid-1990s while on a trip to India where she accompanied him as an assistant. She
claims to have been under the impression that the trip was a professional one, and that she made her non-consent known.

Publications
 Ganga: Sacred River of India (1974), Perennial, Bombay
  Calcutta (1975), (preface by Joseph Lelyveld), Perennial, Bombay
 Rajasthan (1981), (preface by Satyajit Ray) Thames and Hudson, London and New York; Chêne, Paris; Perennial, Bombay. .
 Kumbh Mela (1981), Arthaud, Paris; Perennia, Bombay
 Kashmir: Garden of the Himalayas (1983), Thames and Hudson, London and New York; Perennia, Bombay
 Kerala: The Spice Coast of India (1986), Thames and Hudson, London and New York; Chêne, Paris. .
 Banaras: The Sacred City of India  (1987), Thames and Hudson, London and New York Chêne, Paris
 Calcutta: the home and the street (1988), Thames and Hudson, London and New York; Chêne, Paris. .
 The Ganges (1992), Thames and Hudson, London and New York; Aperture, New York (Japanese, German and Italian editions).
 Bombay: Gateway to India (1994), (conversation with V.S. Naipaul), Aperture, New York; Perennia, Bombay. .
 The Grand Trunk Road (1995), Aperture, New York; Perennia, Bombay
 Tamil Nadu (1997), (preface by R.K. Narayan), DAP, New York. 
 River of Colour: The India of Raghubir Singh (1998, 2000, 2006), Phaido, London (2000 French and German editions). .
 A Way into India (2002), Phaido, London. .

Exhibitions
In 1998, the Art Institute of Chicago organized a retrospective exhibition of his work, which was still on display at the time of his death. The book River of Colour was published on the occasion of this exhibition.

In February 1999, what had been intended as a mid-career retrospective exhibition of his work opened at the National Gallery of Modern Art, New Delhi, after showing at the Bon Marché in Paris and the Art Institute of Chicago.

Solo exhibitions
 1983 	Williams College Museum of Art, Williamstown
 1983 	Museum of Photographic Arts, San Diego
 1984 	Museum of Art, Rhode Island School of Design
 1984 	Fogg Art Museum, Harvard University, Cambridge
 1984 	Duke University, Durham
 1985 	University of California Museum, Berkeley
 1985 	Pace McGill Gallery, New York
 1987  Arnolfini Gallery, Bristol
 1987 	National Museum of Photography, Bradford
 1989 Arthur M. Sackler Gallery, Smithsonian Institution, Washington DC
 1991 	Center for Creative Photography, Tucson, Arizona
 1992  Dallas Museum of Art, Dallas, Texas
 1992  Sewall Art Gallery, Houston, Texas
 1992  Piramal Gallery, National Center for Performing Arts, Bombay
 1994 	Piramal Gallery, National Center for Performing Arts, Bombay
 1994 	Burden Gallery, Aperture Foundation, New York
 1995 	Max Mueller Bhawan, New Delhi
 1998 	Feature Inc., New York
 1999 	National Gallery of Modern Art, Bombay
 1999 	National Gallery of Modern Art, New Delhi
 1999 	The Art Institute of Chicago
 2001 	The Museum of Photography, Tel-Hai
 2002 	Foundation Querini Stampalia, Venice
 2003 	Arthur M. Sackler Gallery, Smithsonian Institution, Washington DC
 2004 	Sepia Gallery, New York
 2005 	National Museum of Photography, Bradford
 2005 	Galerie f5.6, Munich
 2005 	Paris Photo
 2006 	Lille 3000: Colysée de Lambersart
 2006 	Lille 3000: Maison Folie, Wazemmes
 2008  The Gallery at Hermès, New York and Berlin (with Dayanita Singh)
 2017  The Met Breuer, New York

Public collections
 Tate Modern, London
 Museum of Modern Art, New York (MoMA)
 Metropolitan Museum of Art, New York
 Philadelphia Museum of Art, Philadelphia
 Art Institute of Chicago
 Hirshhorn Museum and Sculpture Garden, Washington DC
 Arthur M. Sackler Gallery, Smithsonian Institution, Washington DC
 San Francisco Museum of Modern Art
 Museum of Modern Art, Oxford
 Centro per l'arte contemporanea Luigi Pecci, Prato
 Williams College Museum of Art, Williamstown
 National Media Museum, Bradford
 Tokyo Metropolitan Museum of Photography
 Los Angeles County Museum of Art (LACMA)

Notes

References
 
 Freedman, Ariela (2005). "On the Ganges side of modernism: Raghubir Singh, Amitav Ghosh, and the postcolonial modern." In Laura Doyle and Laura A. Winkiel, eds, Geomodernisms: race, modernism, modernity. Bloomington: Indiana University Press. .

External links 
 
 Singh Biography and works at Artnet

 An Encounter with Raghubir Singh at The Telegraph (Kolkata)

20th-century Indian photographers
1942 births
1999 deaths
Artists from Jaipur
Rajasthani people
Travel photographers
Landscape photographers
School of Visual Arts faculty
Columbia University faculty
Cooper Union faculty
Recipients of the Padma Shri in arts
Street photographers
Indian emigrants to the United States
Indian nature photographers
20th-century Indian painters
American male artists of Indian descent
American male artists
American artists
Indian travel writers
20th-century Indian non-fiction writers
Indian male writers
Writers from Jaipur
Photographers from Rajasthan